Villers-au-Bois is a commune in the Pas-de-Calais department in the Hauts-de-France region of France.

Geography

Population

Places of interest
 The church, dating from the sixteenth century.
 The large Commonwealth War Graves Commission cemetery: Villers Station Cemetery

See also
Communes of the Pas-de-Calais department

References

External links

 Official website of the Communauté d'agglomération 
 Villers Station CWGC cemetery

Villersaubois
Artois